Dashu District is a suburban district located in Kaohsiung City, Taiwan near the Kaoping River. Fo Guang Shan is one of largest tourist attractions in Dashu District. It is also the base of E-Da World, a new lifestyle destination that encompasses the upscale Crowne Plaza Kaohsiung E-Da World hotel, the E-Da Skylark hotel, the E-DA Theme Park, the E-Da Mall, E-Da City (Real Estate Development) and I-Shou University.

History
After the handover of Taiwan from Japan to the Republic of China in 1945, Dashu was organized as a rural township of Kaohsiung County. On 25 December 2010, Kaohsiung County was merged with Kaohsiung City and Dashu was upgraded to a district of the city.

Geography
Area: 66.9811 km2
Population: 40,739 people (January 2023)

Administrative divisions
The district consists of Zhuliao, Jiuqu, Jiutang, Shuian, Shuiliao, Shejiao, Xingshan, Heshan, Gushan, Dakeng, Jingjiao, Xiaoping, Longmu, Dashu, Sanhe, Xipu, Xingtian and Tongling Village.

Education

Higher education
 I-Shou University

Senior high schools
 Pu-Men High School
 Kaohsiung Yida Private International Senior High School (高雄市私立義大國際高級中學)

Junior high schools
 Kaohsiung Dashu Junior High School (高雄市立大樹國民中學)
 Kaohsiung Xipu Junior High School (高雄市立溪埔國民中學)
 Kaohsiung Yida Private International Junior High School (高雄市私立義大國際高級中學附設國民中學)

Primary schools
 Kaohsiung Dashu District Dashu Primary School (高雄市大樹區大樹國民小學)
 Kaohsiung Dashu District Jiuqu Primary School (高雄市大樹區九曲國民小學)
 Kaohsiung Dashu District Shui Laotian Primary School (高雄市大樹區水寮國民小學)
 Kaohsiung Dashu District Xipu Primary School (高雄市大樹區溪埔國民小學)
 Kaohsiung Dashu District Longmu Primary School (高雄市大樹區龍目國民小學)
 Kaohsiung Dashu District Xiaoping Primary School (高雄市大樹區小坪國民小學)
 Kaohsiung Dashu District Gushan Primary School (高雄市大樹區姑山國民小學)
 Kaohsiung Yida Private International Primary School (高雄市私立義大國際高級中學附設國民小學)
 Kaohsiung Dashu District Xingtian Primary School (高雄市大樹區興田國民小學)

International schools
 I-Shou International School

Tourist attractions
 Buddha Memorial Center
 Fo Guang Shan Buddha Museum
 E-DA Theme Park
 Ligang Bridge
 Sanhe Tile Kiln
 Taiwan Pineapple Museum

Transportation
 TRA Jiuqutang Station

Kao-Ping Hsi Bridge

See also
 Kaohsiung

References

External links 

 

Districts of Kaohsiung